Saint-Hilaire-sur-Risle (literally Saint-Hilaire on Risle) is a commune in the Orne department in north-western France.

See also
Communes of the Orne department

References

Sainthilairesurrisle